The following is a list of notable culinary and prepared sauces used in cooking and food service.

General

 
 
 
 
 
 
 
 
 
 
 
 
 
 
 
 
 
 
 
 
 
 
 
 
  (salsa roja)
 
 
  – a velouté sauce flavored with tomato
 
  – prepared using mushrooms and lemon

By type

Brown sauces

 include:

Butter sauces

 
 
 
 Beurre noisette

Emulsified sauces

 
 
 
 
 
 
 
 (w/ chilli)

Fish sauces

Green sauces
 See

Tomato sauces

Hot sauces

 Pepper sauces

Mustard sauces

 Chile pepper-tinged sauces

 s include:

 
  sauce
  sauce

Meat-based sauces

Pink sauces
 See Pink sauce

Sauces made of chopped fresh ingredients

 
 
 
 
 
 
 
 Latin American Salsa cruda of various kinds

Sweet sauces

 
 
 
 
 
 
 
 
 
 
  not liquid, but called a sauce nonetheless

White sauces

By region

Africa

Sauces in African cuisine include:

Asia

East Asian sauces

 Prepared sauces
 
 
 
 
 
 
 
  (Chinese; see umeboshi paste below for Japanese pickled plum sauce)
 
 
 
 
 
 
 , or Japanese pickled plum sauce, a thick sauce from a fruit called a plum in English but which is closer to an apricot
 
 Cooked sauces 
 
 
 
 
 
  – a way of cooking in Japan, a branch of sauces in North America

Southeast Asian sauces

Caucasus
Sauces in Caucasian cuisine (the Caucasus region) include:

Mediterranean

Middle East

Sauces in Middle Eastern cuisine include:

South America
Sauces in South American cuisine include:

By country

Argentina

Sauces in Argentine cuisine include:

Barbados
Sauces in the cuisine of Barbados include:

Belgium
Sauces in Belgian cuisine include:
 Andalouse sauce – a mildly spiced sauce made from mayonnaise, tomatoes and peppers
 Brasil sauce – mayonnaise with pureed pineapple, tomato and spices
  – A "gypsy" sauce of tomatoes, paprika and chopped bell peppers, borrowed from Germany

Bolivia

Sauces in Bolivian cuisine include:

Brazil

Canada
Sauces in Canadian cuisine include:

Chile
 
 Salsa Americana – Chilean relish made of pickles, pickled onions, and pickled carrots

China

Colombia

Denmark
  – a key ingrediant in the Danish national dish Stegt flæsk med persillesovs

England
 Halford Leicestershire Table Sauce
 Worcestershire sauce
 Tewkesbury mustard
 HP Sauce

France

In the late 19th century, and early 20th century, the chef Auguste Escoffier consolidated the list of sauces proposed by Marie-Antoine Carême to four Grandes-Sauces-de-Base in Le guide culinaire. They are:

  – a fortified brown veal stock sauce.
  – white stock-based sauce, thickened with a roux or a liaison.
  – an orange sauce, commonly for duck à l'orange.
  – milk-based sauce, thickened with a white roux.
  – a tomato-based sauce.

In addition to the four types of great base sauces that required heat to produce, he also wrote that sauce mayonnaise, as a cold sauce, was also a Sauce-Mère (Mother Sauce), in much the same way as Sauce Espagnole and Sauce Velouté due to the number of derivative sauces that can be produced.
  – an emulsion of egg yolk, butter, and an acid such as lemon or vinegar.

In Escoffier's 1907 book A Guide to Modern Cookery, an abridged English version of his Le guide culinaire
, it presented readers with a list of sauces that have also come to be known as the Five Mother Sauces of French cuisine:

 Espagnole sauce
 Velouté sauce
 Béchamel sauce
 Tomato sauce
 Hollandaise sauce

Of his French language publications, both Le guide culinaire and his last book, Ma cuisine that was published in 1934, make no direct mention of Hollandaise as being a Sauce-Mère. Both titles do mention that Sauce Mayonnaise could be considered as a Sauce-Mère within their lists of cold sauces. The 1979 English translation by Cracknell and Kaufmann of the 4th edition of Le guide culinaire also maintains similar wording.

Additional sauces of French origin include:

Georgia

Sauces in Georgian cuisine include:

Germany
Sauces in German cuisine include:

Greece

Sauces in Greek cuisine include:

India
Sauces are usually called Chatni or Chutney in India which are a part of almost every meal. Specifically, it is used as dip with most of the snacks.

 Coconut chutney (South India)
 Garlic chutney (South India)
 Mango Chutney (South India)
 Coriander (North India)
 Mint chutney (North India)
 Tomato chutney
 Imli (North India)
 Green chillies
 Aloobukhara (North India)
 Khajoor (North India)

Indonesia
Sauces in Indonesian cuisine include:

Iran
Sauces in Iranian cuisine include:

Italy

Sauces in Italian cuisine include:
 
 

 
 

 Bolognese ragù

Jamaica
Sauces in Jamaican cuisine include:

Japan
Sauces in Japanese cuisine include:
 
 
 
 , or Japanese pickled plum sauce

Korea

Sauces in Korean cuisine include:

Libya
Sauces in Libyan cuisine include:

Malaysia
Sauces in Malaysian cuisine include:

Mexico

Sauces in Mexican cuisine include:
 
 
 
Salsa Macha
Salsa Verde
Salsa Roja
Salsa Borracha

Netherlands
Sauces in Dutch cuisine include:

Peru

Ocopa
Crema de Rocoto
Llatan
Mayonesa de aceitunas (black olive mayonnaise)

Philippines

Sauces in Philippine cuisine include:
 
 
 
 – a mixture of soy sauce, chopped bird's eye chillies, chopped onions, and calamansi lime juice—a traditional dipping sauce for grilled meats and seafood.  The island of Guam has a similar sauce called finadene.
 – used primarily as a dipping sauce for lechon or whole roasted pig.  Flavour is savoury, sweet and piquant, vaguely reminiscent of British style brown sauces but with a coarser texture.

Poland
Sauces in Polish cuisine include:
 Black Polish sauce – Based on honey, vinegar, ginger and black pepper. This sauce is not very common today. 
 Ćwikła – Made of horseradish and cooked, minced beets. Very common during Easter . Served with various meats to eat with bread.
 Cranberry horseradish sauce – Consists of horseradish, minced cranberries, sour cream and mayonnaise.
 Dill sauce – Sauce which can be made hot or cold. Cold is made of dill, yoghurt and spices. Hot consists of roux, single/double cream or is starch thickened instead of a yoghurt. Hot version can be served with golabki or meatballs, cold one with cooked fish.
 Horseradish sauce – Made with sour cream, mayonnaise, lemon juice and minced horseradish. It may be eaten with hard-boiled eggs, bacon or baked/fried meats. It can also be put on sandwiches.
 Garlic sauce – Its main ingredients are garlic, mayonnaise, sour cream or yoghurt, herbs and spices. Similar, perhaps, to ranch dressing. It's eaten with pizza or used as a dressing to side salad (usually cauliflower or broccoli). It can be also made with only garlic and melted butter, to be tossed with asparagus, broad beans or green beans.
 Grey Polish sauce – Consists of roux and beef, fish, or vegetable stock seasoned with wine or lemon juice. Additions include caramel, raisins, almonds, chopped onions, grated gingerbread or double cream.
 Hunter's sauce (Polish: sos myśliwski) – Tomato puree, onions, mushrooms, fried bacon and pickled cucumbers. 
  – A kefir or sour cream sauce or salad with thinly sliced cucumbers, sugar and herbs.
 Muślinowy sauce – A sauce perhaps similar to Hollandaise mixed with whipped cream or beaten egg whites. 
  – Garnish made of melted butter, chopped boiled eggs, bread crumbs, salt, lemon juice and herbs. In Poland it's usually used as a dressing, served with cooked vegetables like green beans, cauliflower, broccoli or Brussels sprouts next to potatoes and meat. 
 Salsza sauce – Sauce with butter, onion, parsley root, garlic, bay leaves, thyme, basil, vinegar, flour and wine.
  – A velouté sauce mixed with horseradish, lemon juice and sour cream.
 Yellow Polish sauce – Made with wine, egg yolks, butter, sugar, cinnamon and saffron.

Portugal
Sauces in Portuguese cuisine include:
  – An onion sauce of Portuguese origin used for fish and game.
Cervejeira sauce – A beer sauce predominantly used for steaks.
Escabeche sauce – A vinegar-based sauce predominantly used for fish.
  – A red or orange sauce, often tomato-based, that includes beer along with a variety of other possible ingredients.

Puerto Rico
Sauces in Puerto Rican cuisine include:

 
 
  Sauce –Pickling sauce made with chili, garlic, herbs, and vinegar primarily used for guineo (green banana), onions, root vegetables, chicken gizzard, and fish
  – Spicy thick coconut milk and lime sauce
  – The sauce is made with sofrito, chilies, ketchup, sour orange, Worcestershire sauce, and mayonnaise

Romania
Sauces in Romanian cuisine include:

Russia

Sauces in Russian cuisine include:

Spain
Sauces in Spanish cuisine include:

Canary Islands
Sauces used in the cuisine of the Canary Islands include:

Catalonia

Sauces in Catalan cuisine include:

Sweden
Sauces in Swedish cuisine include:
 
 Hovmästarsås - made with mustard and dill
 Lingonberry sauce
 Skagen sauce - made with shrimp, mayonnaise and other ingredients

Switzerland
Sauces in Swiss cuisine include:
  – a butter-based sauce served with grilled beef

Thailand

Sauces in Thai cuisine include:

United Kingdom

Sauces in British cuisine include:
 
 
 
 
 
  (Oxford sauce)

United States

Sauces in the cuisine of the United States include:

Vietnam
Dipping sauces are a mainstay of many Vietnamese dishes. Some of the commonly used sauces are:
  - Fermented shrimp sauce
  - Caramalised, vegetable dip
  - Anchovy sauce
  - Green chili with seafood sauce
 
  - Salty fish sauce
  - Sweet fish sauce
  - Ginger fish sauce
  - Peanut sauce

Prepared sauces

See also

 
 
 
 
 
 
 
 
 
 
 
 
 
 List of mayonnaises
 
 List of syrups

References

Book sources

Further reading
 
 
 Murdoch (2004) Essential Seafood Cookbook Seafood sauces, p. 128–143. Murdoch Books.

External links

 "Sauce" entry at Encyclopædia Britannica

Condiments